is credited with the introduction of rugby to Japan. He was educated at the Leys School in Cambridge and then Trinity Hall, a college of Cambridge University. He introduced rugby to students at Keio University, in 1899, with the help of Edward Bramwell Clarke. Later, he pursued a career in banking.

See also 
Anglo-Japanese relations
Japan national rugby union team
Japan Rugby Football Union
Kikuchi Dairoku
Japanese students in Britain

References

 For the historical background see 'Britain's Contribution to the Development of Rugby Football in Japan 1874-1998' by Alison Nish, Chapter 27, Britain & Japan: Biographical Portraits , Volume III, Japan Library, 1999 
 Japanese Students at Cambridge University in the Meiji Era, 1868-1912: Pioneers for the Modernization of Japan, by Noboru Koyama, translated by Ian Ruxton, lulu.com, 2004. ).

Alumni of Trinity Hall, Cambridge
Japanese expatriates in the United Kingdom
People educated at The Leys School
1873 births
1933 deaths
Japanese rugby union players
Rugby union people in Japan
History of rugby union